The Mulanje skink (Trachylepis mlanjensis) is a species of skink found in Malawi.

References

Trachylepis
Reptiles described in 1953
Taxa named by Arthur Loveridge